The men's 1500 metres at the 1974 European Athletics Championships was held in Rome, Italy, at Stadio Olimpico on 6 and 8 September 1974.

Medalists

Results

Final
8 September

Heats
6 September

Heat 1

Heat 2

Heat 3

Participation
According to an unofficial count, 28 athletes from 19 countries participated in the event.

 (1)
 (2)
 (1)
 (1)
 (1)
 (1)
 (1)
 (2)
 (1)
 (1)
 (1)
 (3)
 (1)
 (2)
 (2)
 (2)
 (1)
 (2)
 (2)

References

1500 metres
1500 metres at the European Athletics Championships